Jay Johnson (born 8 November 1959) is a former American mountain runner who won 1987 World Mountain Running Championships.

References

External links
 Jay Johnson profile at Association of Road Racing Statisticians

1959 births
Living people
Place of birth missing (living people)
American male mountain runners
World Mountain Running Championships winners